Narsarmijit, formerly Narsaq Kujalleq and Frederiksdal, is a settlement in southern Greenland. It is located in the Kujalleq municipality near Cape Thorvaldsen. Its population was 66 in 2020. There has been a slow but steady pattern of emigration since the late 1950s.

Geography 

History 
The city is located in the area of the easternmost of the Norse settlements during their colonization of Greenland.

The Moravian missionary Conrad Kleinschmidt (1768–1832) founded the station of Friedrichsthal (lit. "Frederick's Valley") in 1824. The name honored Frederick VI of Denmark. The station was the Moravian's fourth, after Neu-Herrnhut (1733), Lichtenfels (1748), and Lichtenau (1774) and before Umanak (1861) and Idlorpait (1864). All the Greenland missions were surrendered to the Lutheran church in 1900. In the 19th century, the area served as a prime territory for sealing. Members of the settlement rescued the survivors of the ill-fated German polar expedition's Hansa in 1870. In 1906, pastor Jens Chemnitz founded Greenland's first sheep farm in Narsarmijit; the industry has since moved north to the larger pastures around Narsaq.

Until December 31, 2008, the settlement belonged to the Nanortalik municipality. Since the administrative reform enacted on January 1, 2009, the settlement has been part of Kujalleq.

Transport 

The village is served by the Narsarmijit Heliport. Air Greenland district helicopters link the settlement with Nanortalik, and further to Qaqortoq and Narsarsuaq.

Population 
Most towns and settlements in southern Greenland exhibit negative growth patterns over the last two decades, with many settlements rapidly depopulating. The population of Narsarmijit has decreased nearly a half relative to the 1990 levels, by nearly a quarter relative to the 2000 levels.

References

Populated places in Greenland
History of the Greenland work of the Moravian Church
Populated places established in 1824